Giancarlo Marocchi  (born 4 July 1965) is an Italian former professional footballer who played as a central midfielder. Throughout his club career, he played for Juventus, the club with which he won a Scudetto, two Coppe Italia, one UEFA Champions League, and two UEFA Cups; he also played for his home-town club Bologna, on two occasions. At international level, he represented Italy at the 1990 FIFA World Cup, where they finished in third place on home soil.

Club career 
After starting out in the Bologna youth system, Marocchi played for Bologna (1982–88, 1996–2000) and Juventus (1988–96) throughout his career. In 18 seasons as a professional he collected 500 appearances in league play with 33 goals; 287 with Bologna (18 goals) and 213 with Juventus (15 goals). In Serie A he racked up 329 appearances and 20 goals. 
In his first spell with Bologna, he won the Serie B title during the 1987–88 season, earning promotion to Serie A. Upon returning to the club, he won the UEFA Intertoto Cup in 1998 as the club's captain, after inheriting the armband from Roberto Baggio. He helped Bologna to finish the league season in 8th place, earning a spot in the 1998–99 UEFA Cup, where they reached the semi-finals, losing out to Olympique Marseille; during the match he was sent-off, receiving a four-match suspension. He also helped Bologna to reach the semi-finals of the 1998–99 Coppa Italia. With Juventus, Marocchi enjoyed a successful eight season spell, featuring as a starter under managers Dino Zoff, Maifredi and Trapattoni, even wearing the number 10 shirt on occasion during the 1989–90 season, although he began to be deployed with less frequency under Trapattoni and Lippi in later years; with the club, he won a Coppa Italia and an UEFA Cup in 1990, another UEFA Cup in 1993, a Scudetto-Coppa Italia double in 1995, as well as the Supercoppa Italiana and the UEFA Champions League in his final season with the club, in 1996. He retired from professional football in 2000.

International career 
Marocchi earned 11 caps for the Italy national football team from 1988 to 1991, and was included by manager Azeglio Vicini in the 1990 FIFA World Cup squad, a tournament in which Italy reached the semi-finals, finishing in third place on home soil. He failed to make an appearance in the tournament, however, due to the presence of Giuseppe Giannini, Nicola Berti, and Carlo Ancelotti in midfield. He made his debut in a 2–0 win over Scotland on 22 December 1988, and he played his final match for Italy on 13 February 1991, in a home 0–0 draw against Belgium, in Terni.

After retirement 
After retiring from professional football, Marocchi worked for his former club Bologna as a sporting director, in addition to other managerial positions; he also worked as a scout, as a coach, and with the youth sector. Currently, he works as TV pundit for the Italian broadcaster SKY Sport Italia.

Style of play 
A dynamic, talented, and hard-working central or box-to-box midfielder, although he was not the most naturally creative player, Marocchi was known for his consistency, and was capable both of breaking down the opposition's play as well as subsequently starting attacking plays for his own team after winning back possession.

Honours

Club 
Juventus
Serie A: 1994–95
Coppa Italia: 1989–90, 1994–95
UEFA Champions League: 1995–96
UEFA Cup: 1989–90, 1992–93

Bologna
Serie B: 1987–88
UEFA Intertoto Cup: 1998

International 
Italy
FIFA World Cup: 1990 (third place)

Orders 
 5th Class / Knight: Cavaliere Ordine al Merito della Repubblica Italiana: 1991

References

External links 

 

1965 births
Living people
Italian footballers
Italy international footballers
Association football midfielders
Bologna F.C. 1909 players
Juventus F.C. players
Serie A players
Serie B players
Serie C players
1990 FIFA World Cup players
UEFA Cup winning players
Knights of the Order of Merit of the Italian Republic